Holmium(III) iodide is an iodide of holmium, with the chemical formula of HoI3. It is used as a component of metal halide lamps.

Preparation 

Holmium(III) iodide can be obtained by directly reacting holmium and iodine:

2 Ho + 3 I2 → 2 HoI3

Holmium(III) iodide can also be obtained via the direct reaction between holmium and mercury(II) iodide:

 2 Ho + 3 HgI2 → 2 HoI3 + 3 Hg

The mercury produced in the reaction can be removed by distillation.

Holmium(III) iodide hydrate can be converted to the anhydrous form by dehydration with a large excess of ammonium iodide (since the compound is prone to hydrolysis).

Properties 

Holmium(III) iodide is a highly hygroscopic substance that dissolves in water. It forms yellow hexagonal crystals with a crystal structure similar to bismuth(III) iodide. In air, it quickly absorbs moisture and forms hydrates. The corresponding oxide iodide is also readily formed at elevated temperature.

References 

Holmium compounds
Iodides
Lanthanide halides